Lauras may refer to:

 Lauras Bielinis, a Lithuanian political scientist
 , Lithuanian footballer

See also 
 Lauras Stern, German animated children's television series
 Lauras Entscheidung, German television film

 Laura (disambiguation)